The 1938 Brooklyn Dodgers season was their 55th season. The team finished with a record of 69–80, finishing in seventh place in the National League. The 1938 season saw Babe Ruth hired as the first base coach, and lights installed by the team at Ebbets Field on June 15.

Offseason 
 March 6, 1938: Eddie Morgan and cash were traded by the Dodgers to the Philadelphia Phillies for Dolph Camilli.

Regular season 
 June 15, 1938: Leo Durocher was the final out of the ninth inning as Johnny Vander Meer of the Cincinnati Reds threw the second of his two consecutive no hitters.

Season standings

Record vs. opponents

Notable transactions 
 April 15, 1938: Ernie Koy was purchased by the Dodgers from the New York Yankees.
 May 2, 1938: Tom Winsett was purchased from the Dodgers by the New York Giants.
 July 9, 1938: Buck Marrow was purchased from the Dodgers by the Cleveland Indians.
 July 11, 1938: Whit Wyatt was purchased by the Dodgers from the Cleveland Indians.
 July 11, 1938: Gibby Brack was traded by the Dodgers to the Philadelphia Phillies for Tuck Stainback.
 July 19, 1938: Johnnie Chambers was purchased by the Dodgers from the St. Louis Cardinals.
 August 8, 1938: Max Butcher was traded by the Dodgers to the Philadelphia Phillies for Wayne LaMaster.
 August 12, 1938: Johnnie Chambers was traded by the Dodgers to the Boston Red Sox for Lee Rogers.
 August 23, 1938: The Dodgers traded cash and a player to be named later to the Washington Senators for Fred Sington. The Dodgers completed the deal by sending Johnnie Chambers to the Red Sox on January 5, 1939.
 September 9, 1938: Jimmy Outlaw was purchased by the Dodgers from the Cincinnati Reds. The purchase was voided on September 14.
 September 14, 1938: Don Ross was purchased by the Dodgers from the Detroit Tigers.

Roster

Player stats

Batting

Starters by position 
Note: Pos = Position; G = Games played; AB = At bats; H = Hits; Avg. = Batting average; HR = Home runs; RBI = Runs batted in

Other batters 
Note: G = Games played; AB = At bats; H = Hits; Avg. = Batting average; HR = Home runs; RBI = Runs batted in

Pitching

Starting pitchers 
Note: G = Games pitched; IP = Innings pitched; W = Wins; L = Losses; ERA = Earned run average; SO = Strikeouts

Other pitchers 
Note: G = Games pitched; IP = Innings pitched; W = Wins; L = Losses; ERA = Earned run average; SO = Strikeouts

Relief pitchers 
Note: G = Games pitched; W = Wins; L = Losses; SV = Saves; ERA = Earned run average; SO = Strikeouts

Awards and honors 
1938 Major League Baseball All-Star Game
Leo Durocher starting shortstop
Cookie Lavagetto
Babe Phelps

Farm system 

LEAGUE CHAMPIONS: Elmira, Pensacola, Superior

Notes

References 
Baseball-Reference season page
Baseball Almanac season page

External links 
1938 Brooklyn Dodgers uniform
Brooklyn Dodgers reference site
Acme Dodgers page 
Retrosheet

Los Angeles Dodgers seasons
Brooklyn Dodgers season
Brooklyn
1930s in Brooklyn
Flatbush, Brooklyn